Antidaphne is a genus of flowering plants belonging to the family Santalaceae.

Its native range is Tropical America, Chile.

Species:

Antidaphne amazonensis 
Antidaphne andina 
Antidaphne antidaphneoides 
Antidaphne glaziovii 
Antidaphne hondurensis 
Antidaphne punctulata 
Antidaphne schottii 
Antidaphne viscoidea 
Antidaphne wrightii

References

Santalaceae
Santalales genera